Jason Ensler is an American film director, television director, producer, and screenwriter.

Early life 
Jason Ensler attended Brandeis University where he earned a BA in Politics and Theater.2 He graduated USC School of Cinematic Arts with an MFA in Cinema/Television production.

Career 

Ensler began his work in television as part of the creative team at NBC 2000, a division of NBC promo. He designed launch campaigns for The West Wing, Scrubs, Frasier, Third Watch, The Olympics, and The NBA.  He produced and edited the Upfront presentation for NBC's 75th Anniversary, and wrote and directed The Zucker Follies, a musical mockumentary starring Megan Mullally, Martin Sheen, Sean Hayes, and many others.3

In 2002, Ensler directed Behind The Camera: The Unauthorized Story of Three's Company for NBC, which documents the true story of ambition, greed, and betrayal that rocked the set of the hit show Three's Company. He directed Martha, Inc.: The Story of Martha Stewart starring Cybill Shepherd and Tim Matheson, which chronicled Martha Stewart's rise to fame, subsequent incarceration for insider trading, and eventual comeback. Both films were critically acclaimed and were the highest rated TV movies of the decade.5

He began his career in episodic television with episodes of Scrubs and The West Wing before directing the feature film Grilled for New Line Cinema.6 Written by William Tepper, and starring Ray Romano, Kevin James, Burt Reynolds, Juliette Lewis, SophiaVergara, Kim Coates, and Michael Rapaport. It received mixed reviews but has since gained a loyal fan base.7

Ensler has since directed and executive produced the pilots for: Andy Barker, P.I., Franklin & Bash, Hart of Dixie, Cult, The Passage, Monarch, and Wolf Pack, among others. He served as executive producer and series director on Fox’s The Exorcist, and on all three seasons of the critically acclaimed, Love, Victor on Hulu and Disney+.

Documentaries 
Ensler is on the executive board of Shifting Baselines, a think tank and production entity founded and run by author and filmmaker Randy Olson, that seeks to find more effective ways of communicating science to the public. He produced, directed and edited IRIS, a documentary for Children's Hospital Los Angeles, about  Retinoblastoma, a rare form of children’s eye cancer, which was effective in passing legislation in California for early detection. And he produced, directed, and edited Farewell, My Subaru, a short documentary about author Doug Fine and the hard-won benefits of his carbon neutral lifestyle in rural New Mexico.13

Filmography

Films

Television

References
2  http://www.mocavo.com/The-Justice-Brandeis-University-Aug-1991-May-1992-Volume-Roll-12-Volume-45-Number-1-Volume-45-Number-25/297790/100

and http://2degreesofalie.tumblr.com/post/36148487895/directorproducer-jason-ensler-shares-stories-of

3 http://www.firstpost.com/topic/person/eric-mccormack-nbc-mockumentary-2002-video-shNJIXU7G9Q-218-12.html

and http://gogoartqueen.tumblr.com/post/15462587273/pitypie-the-zucker-follies-an-nbc-promo-from

4 http://www.sitcomsonline.com/jacksbistro/nbcmovie.html

5 https://www.nytimes.com/2003/05/12/arts/television-review-those-sweet-days-when-a-sitcom-had-clout.html

6 https://www.nytimes.com/2004/11/07/movies/moviesspecial/the-class-of-200405.html?_r=0

and https://variety.com/2004/film/columns/eatery-immortalized-in-grilled-pic-1117908102/

7  https://www.cinemablend.com/dvds/Grilled-1663.html 

and https://filmfiend.livejournal.com/40871.html

10 https://cinema.usc.edu/alumni/hotsheet/2014april.cfm

11 https://www.wsj.com/articles/tv-review-foxs-red-band-society-1410491741

12 http://thisisjasonensler.com/blog/?p=444

13 http://scienceblogs.com/shiftingbaselines/2008/03/31/a-new-short-film-from-shifting/

14 https://www.tvfanatic.com/2016/10/the-exorcist-season-1-episode-5-review-through-my-most-grievous/

External links

1970 births
People from East Setauket, New York
American film directors
American television directors
Television producers from New York (state)
Living people
Place of birth missing (living people)